The Rondo worm snake (Afrotyphlops rondoensis) is a species of snake in the Typhlopidae family.

References

rondoensis
Reptiles described in 1942